Marley Davidson (sometimes referred to as "Marley Davidson: Bronx Exorcist") is a fictional comic book character created by writer and comic book artist Sandy Jimenez. It made its first appearance on June 15, 1995 in the self-titled independent comic book Marley Davidson, which chronicled the exploits of a Jamaican ex-priest, operating as an exorcist and monster hunter in New York City.

Typical Marley Davidson stories involve classic renditions of undead monsters such as vampires and werewolves as the chief villains and often as agents in conspiratorial plots to undermine and prey upon the poor and the underclass.

Marley Davidson last appeared in the fourth issue of his titular comic book in 1999. A series “reboot” was announced/advertised in issue #40 of World War 3 Illustrated, to resume the series in late 2010.

Creation and development
According to end notes by the author that appear on the inside back cover of the first issue, “In truth, it was not created as a stand alone idea. Marley Davidson is a spin off of…Vladek, Vampire Detective.…Marley Davidson was to be the last side-kick for the planned conclusion of the Vladek series,” and that “Marley Davidson was intended as something of a joke, like the detective ‘Ford Fairlane’ which was named after a car.” While Vladek, Vampire Detective was never published, Marley Davidson was launched by Vampyrotechnic Studios in 1995 out of Wallabout street in Bedford-Stuyvesant, Brooklyn.

Fictional character biography and world
Marley Davidson chronicles the adventures of an exorcist and his team of monster hunters, beginning in a conjectured 1970s New York City where the supernatural is as big a threat to human life as violent crime. The earliest stories in issues 1 and 2, illustrate a hard-scrabble existence, with the protagonists in need of money and support for their war against the undead. Marley Davidson and his team appear to function as mercenaries seeking paying clients, in seeming opposition to the principles and ethics of their mentors, a Rabbi and a Muslim cleric.

Adversaries and enemies
(In order of appearance in the series) Don Escaglia, The Warlocke Amsterdamn, Arthur “Red Boy” Sullivan, Sir William Mayhem.

Supporting characters
Circa 1975: Imam Ali, Anna Von Bayer, Isaac Davidson (younger brother), Sameer Hudson, Franklin "King" Kong, Rabbi Michael Golberg. 

Circa 1977: Jose Daniel Diaz. 

Circa 1979: Kenneth Murphy.

Visual style
Marley Davidson, an independent comic book, was executed with intentionally unsophisticated production means. It has thus far employed artwork that is rendered with only “ball point pens” and without the aid of computer scanning or computer image editing. It has been noted for its “cut out” style achieved by use of unique hand-drawn Xeroxed patterns trimmed to fit in as backdrop elements in the place of screentone or Zip-A-Tone to create different textures.

Tone and profile of the series
Like Sandy Jimenez’s other long-running series, Shit House Poet, Marley Davidson moves in and out of time, story to story. Issues begin with a particular year stamped on the first page as opposed to an actual title, with subsequent issues taking place years later without editorial segue or explanation.

While foremost an action-adventure series, the stories’ setting in the South Bronx introduces realities and social issues more common in crime stories. The series is also noted for its adherence to the classical “faith-based” characterizations of monster legends and a clear aversion to any Science Fiction angles on monster mythology. According to the endnotes in the first issue, Jimenez felt “…the inbuilt religious aspects of this fictional universe were a reaction on my part to the increasing Sci-Fi influences in the horror genre.”

In other media

After the production of an animated short in 2006, a full-length animated feature was announced as being in pre-production in February 2007.

References

1995 comics debuts
1999 comics endings
American comics titles
Comics about orphans
Comics set in New York City
Fantasy comics
Fiction about exorcism
Horror comics
Occult detective fiction
Vampires in comics